Atakishiyev is an Azerbaijani surname. It may refer to:

 Agasalim Atakishiyev (1900-1970), Azerbaijani politician
 Alisattar Atakishiyev (1906-1990), Azerbaijani film director and cinematographer
 Aslan Atakishiyev (1953-1992), Azerbaijani soldier
 Rauf Atakishiyev (1925-1994), Azerbaijani singer, pianist and music teacher

Azerbaijani-language surnames